William McDonald (born October 5, 1979) is an American former professional basketball player. He graduated from the University of South Florida.

In March 2012, McDonald was ejected from a game while playing for Petron Blaze Boosters. During an 80–94 loss to Barako Bull Energy, McDonald was ejected for throwing the ball into Mick Pennisi's forehead.  The ejection trended on YouTube because of Pennisi's 'delayed flop'.

McDonald was drafted 5th overall in the 2019 BIG3 draft by the Ball Hogs. In that year's season, McDonald ranked fourth in scoring and second in rebounding among all players in the league.

The Basketball Tournament
William McDonald played for Overseas Elite in the 2018 edition of The Basketball Tournament. In four games, he averaged 3.5 points per game and 3.3 rebounds per game on 67 percent shooting. Overseas Elite reached the championship game and played Eberlein Drive, winning 70-58 for their fourth consecutive TBT Title.

References

External links
Euroleague.net Profile
NBA.com Summer League rosters
NBA.com Jazz revue
Mirosport.net
 Profile at TAU Cerámica

1979 births
Living people
American expatriate basketball people in Argentina
American expatriate basketball people in China
American expatriate basketball people in France
American expatriate basketball people in Japan
American expatriate basketball people in the Philippines
American expatriate basketball people in Spain
American men's basketball players
Basketball players from New Orleans
Big3 players
Boca Juniors basketball players
Caciques de Humacao players
Cangrejeros de Santurce basketball players
CB Estudiantes players
CB Gran Canaria players
Centers (basketball)
Élan Chalon players
Fujian Sturgeons players
Jiangsu Dragons players
Nanjing Tongxi Monkey Kings players
Joventut Badalona players
Liga ACB players
Philippine Basketball Association imports
Power forwards (basketball)
San-en NeoPhoenix players
Saski Baskonia players
South Florida Bulls men's basketball players
San Miguel Beermen players
Yokohama B-Corsairs players
American men's 3x3 basketball players